Circular dichroism (CD) is dichroism involving circularly polarized light, i.e., the differential absorption of left- and right-handed light. Left-hand circular (LHC) and right-hand circular (RHC) polarized light represent two possible spin angular momentum states for a photon, and so circular dichroism is also referred to as dichroism for spin angular momentum.  This phenomenon was discovered by Jean-Baptiste Biot, Augustin Fresnel, and Aimé Cotton in the first half of the 19th century. Circular dichroism and circular birefringence are manifestations of optical activity. It is exhibited in the absorption bands of optically active chiral molecules. CD spectroscopy has a wide range of applications in many different fields. Most notably, UV CD is used to investigate the secondary structure of proteins. UV/Vis CD is used to investigate charge-transfer transitions. Near-infrared CD is used to investigate geometric and electronic structure by probing metal d→d transitions. Vibrational circular dichroism, which uses light from the infrared energy region, is used for structural studies of small organic molecules, and most recently proteins and DNA.

Physical principles

Circular polarization of light

Electromagnetic radiation consists of an electric  and magnetic  field that oscillate perpendicular to one another and to the propagating direction, a transverse wave. While linearly polarized light occurs when the electric field vector oscillates only in one plane, circularly polarized light occurs when the direction of the electric field vector rotates about its propagation direction while the vector retains constant magnitude. At a single point in space, the circularly polarized-vector will trace out a circle over one period of the wave frequency, hence the name. The two diagrams below show the electric field vectors of linearly and circularly polarized light, at one moment of time, for a range of positions; the plot of the circularly polarized electric vector forms a helix along the direction of propagation . For left circularly polarized light (LCP) with propagation towards the observer, the electric vector rotates counterclockwise. For right circularly polarized light (RCP), the electric vector rotates clockwise.

Interaction of circularly polarized light with matter
When circularly polarized light passes through an absorbing optically active medium, the speeds between right and left polarizations differ as well as their wavelength() and the extent to which they are absorbed. Circular dichroism is the difference . The electric field of a light beam causes a linear displacement of charge when interacting with a molecule (electric dipole), whereas its magnetic field causes a circulation of charge (magnetic dipole). These two motions combined cause an excitation of an electron in a helical motion, which includes translation and rotation and their associated operators.

The rotational strength has also been determined theoretically,

Simply put, since circularly polarized light itself is "chiral", it interacts differently with chiral molecules. That is, the two types of circularly polarized light are absorbed to different extents. In a CD experiment, equal amounts of left and right circularly polarized light of a selected wavelength are alternately radiated into a (chiral) sample. One of the two polarizations is absorbed more than the other one, and this wavelength-dependent difference of absorption is measured, yielding the CD spectrum of the sample. Due to the interaction with the molecule, the electric field vector of the light traces out an elliptical path after passing through the sample.

It is important that the chirality of the molecule can be conformational rather than structural. That is, for instance, a protein molecule with a helical secondary structure can have a CD that changes with changes in the conformation.

Delta absorbance
By definition,

where  (Delta Absorbance) is the difference between absorbance of left circularly polarized (LCP) and right circularly polarized (RCP) light (this is what is usually measured).  is a function of wavelength, so for a measurement to be meaningful the wavelength at which it was performed must be known.

Molar circular dichroism
It can also be expressed, by applying Beer's law, as:

where
 is the molar concentration,
 is the path length in centimeters (cm).

Then

is the molar circular dichroism. This intrinsic property is what is usually meant by the circular dichroism of the substance. Since  is a function of wavelength, a molar circular dichroism value must specify the wavelength at which it is valid.

Extrinsic effects on circular dichroism
In many practical applications of circular dichroism (CD), as discussed below, the measured CD is not simply an intrinsic property of the molecule, but rather depends on the molecular conformation. In such a case the CD may also be a function of temperature, concentration, and the chemical environment, including solvents. In this case the reported CD value must also specify these other relevant factors in order to be meaningful.

In ordered structures lacking two-fold rotational symmetry, optical activity, including differential transmission (and reflection) of circularly polarized waves also depends on the propagation direction through the material. In this case, so-called extrinsic 3d chirality is associated with the mutual orientation of light beam and structure.

Molar ellipticity

Although  is usually measured, for historical reasons most measurements are reported in degrees of ellipticity.
Molar ellipticity is circular dichroism corrected for concentration. Molar circular dichroism and molar ellipticity, are readily interconverted by the equation:

This relationship is derived by defining the ellipticity of the polarization as:

where

When  equals  (when there is no difference in the absorbance of right- and left-circular polarized light),  is 0° and the light is linearly polarized.

Since the intensity or irradiance, of light is proportional to the square of the electric-field vector, the ellipticity becomes:

Then by substituting for I using Beer's law in natural logarithm form:

The ellipticity can now be written as:

The linear dependence of solute concentration and pathlength is removed by defining molar ellipticity as,

Then combining the last two expression with Beer's law, molar ellipticity becomes:

The units of molar ellipticity are historically (deg·cm2/dmol). To calculate molar ellipticity, the sample concentration (g/L), cell pathlength (cm), and the molecular weight (g/mol) must be known.

If the sample is a protein, the mean residue weight (average molecular weight of the amino acid residues it contains) is often used in place of the molecular weight, essentially treating the protein as a solution of amino acids. Using mean residue ellipticity facilitates comparing the CD of proteins of different molecular weight; use of this normalized CD is important in studies of protein structure.

Mean residue ellipticity
Methods for estimating secondary structure in polymers, proteins and polypeptides in particular, often require that the measured molar ellipticity spectrum be converted to a normalized value, specifically a value independent of the polymer length. Mean residue ellipticity is used for this purpose; it is simply the measured molar ellipticity of the molecule divided by the number of monomer units (residues) in the molecule.

Application to biological molecules

In general, this phenomenon will be exhibited in absorption bands of any optically active molecule. As a consequence, circular dichroism is exhibited by biological molecules, because of their dextrorotary and levorotary components. Even more important is that a secondary structure will also impart a distinct CD to its respective molecules. Therefore, the alpha helix of proteins and the double helix of nucleic acids have CD spectral signatures representative of their structures.  The capacity of CD to give a representative structural signature makes it a powerful tool in modern biochemistry with applications that can be found in virtually every field of study.

CD is closely related to the optical rotatory dispersion (ORD) technique, and is generally considered to be more advanced. CD is measured in or near the absorption bands of the molecule of interest, while ORD can be measured far from these bands. CD's advantage is apparent in the data analysis. Structural elements are more clearly distinguished since their recorded bands do not overlap extensively at particular wavelengths as they do in ORD. In principle, these two spectral measurements can be interconverted through an integral transform (Kramers–Kronig relation), if all the absorptions are included in the measurements.

The far-UV (ultraviolet) CD spectrum of proteins can reveal important characteristics of their secondary structure. CD spectra can be readily used to estimate the fraction of a molecule that is in the alpha-helix conformation, the beta-sheet conformation, the beta-turn conformation, or some other (e.g. random coil) conformation. These fractional assignments place important constraints on the possible secondary conformations that the protein can be in. CD cannot, in general, say where the alpha helices that are detected are located within the molecule or even completely predict how many there are. Despite this, CD is a valuable tool, especially for showing changes in conformation. It can, for instance, be used to study how the secondary structure of a molecule changes as a function of temperature or of the concentration of denaturing agents, e.g. Guanidinium chloride or urea. In this way it can reveal important thermodynamic information about the molecule (such as the enthalpy and Gibbs free energy of denaturation) that cannot otherwise be easily obtained. Anyone attempting to study a protein will find CD a valuable tool for verifying that the protein is in its native conformation before undertaking extensive and/or expensive experiments with it. Also, there are a number of other uses for CD spectroscopy in protein chemistry not related to alpha-helix fraction estimation. Moreover, CD spectroscopy has been used in bioinorganic interface studies. Specifically it has been used to analyze the differences in secondary structure of an  engineered protein before and after titration with a reagent.

The near-UV CD spectrum (>250 nm) of proteins provides information on the tertiary structure. The signals obtained in the 250–300 nm region are due to the absorption, dipole orientation and the nature of the surrounding environment of the phenylalanine, tyrosine, cysteine (or S-S disulfide bridges) and tryptophan amino acids. Unlike in far-UV CD, the near-UV CD spectrum cannot be assigned to any particular 3D structure. Rather, near-UV CD spectra provide structural information on the nature of the prosthetic groups in proteins, e.g., the heme groups in hemoglobin and cytochrome c.

Visible CD spectroscopy is a very powerful technique to study metal–protein interactions and can resolve individual d–d electronic transitions as separate bands. CD spectra in the visible light region are only produced when a metal ion is in a chiral environment, thus, free metal ions in solution are not detected. This has the advantage of only observing the protein-bound metal, so pH dependence and stoichiometries are readily obtained. Optical activity in transition metal ion complexes have been attributed to configurational, conformational and the vicinal effects. Klewpatinond and Viles (2007) have produced a set of empirical rules for predicting the appearance of visible CD spectra for Cu2+ and Ni2+ square-planar complexes involving histidine and main-chain coordination.

CD gives less specific structural information than X-ray crystallography and protein NMR spectroscopy, for example, which both give atomic resolution data. However, CD spectroscopy is a quick method that does not require large amounts of proteins or extensive data processing. Thus CD can be used to survey a large number of solvent conditions, varying temperature, pH, salinity, and the presence of various cofactors.

CD spectroscopy is usually used to study proteins in solution, and thus it complements methods that study the solid state. This is also a limitation, in that many proteins are embedded in membranes in their native state, and solutions containing membrane structures are often strongly scattering. CD is sometimes measured in thin films.

CD spectroscopy has also been done using semiconducting materials such as TiO2 to obtain large signals in the UV range of wavelengths, where the electronic transitions for biomolecules often occur.

Experimental limitations

CD has also been studied in carbohydrates, but with limited success due to the experimental difficulties associated with measurement of CD spectra in the vacuum ultraviolet (VUV) region of the spectrum (100–200 nm), where the corresponding CD bands of unsubstituted carbohydrates lie. Substituted carbohydrates with bands above the VUV region have been successfully measured.

Measurement of CD is also complicated by the fact that typical aqueous buffer systems often absorb in the range where structural features exhibit differential absorption of circularly polarized light. Phosphate, sulfate, carbonate, and acetate buffers are generally incompatible with CD unless made extremely dilute e.g. in the 10–50 mM range. The TRIS buffer system should be completely avoided when performing far-UV CD. Borate and Onium compounds are often used to establish the appropriate pH range for CD experiments. Some experimenters have substituted fluoride for chloride ion because fluoride absorbs less in the far UV, and some have worked in pure water. Another, almost universal, technique is to minimize solvent absorption by using shorter path length cells when working in the far UV, 0.1 mm path lengths are not uncommon in this work.

In addition to measuring in aqueous systems, CD, particularly far-UV CD, can be measured in organic solvents e.g. ethanol, methanol, trifluoroethanol (TFE). The latter has the advantage to induce structure formation of proteins, inducing beta-sheets in some and alpha helices in others, which they would not show under normal aqueous conditions. Most common organic solvents such as acetonitrile, THF, chloroform, dichloromethane are however, incompatible with far-UV CD.

It may be of interest to note that the protein CD spectra used in secondary structure estimation are related to the π to π* orbital absorptions of the amide bonds linking the amino acids. These absorption bands lie partly in the so-called vacuum ultraviolet (wavelengths less than about 200 nm). The wavelength region of interest is actually inaccessible in air because of the strong absorption of light by oxygen at these wavelengths. In practice these spectra are measured not in vacuum but in an oxygen-free instrument (filled with pure nitrogen gas).

Once oxygen has been eliminated, perhaps the second most important technical factor in working below 200 nm is to design the rest of the optical system to have low losses in this region. Critical in this regard is the use of aluminized mirrors whose coatings have been optimized for low loss in this region of the spectrum.

The usual light source in these instruments is a high pressure, short-arc xenon lamp. Ordinary xenon arc lamps are unsuitable for use in the low UV. Instead, specially constructed lamps with envelopes made from high-purity synthetic fused silica must be used.

Light from synchrotron sources has a much higher flux at short wavelengths, and has been used to record CD down to 160 nm. In 2010 the CD spectrophotometer at the electron storage ring facility ISA at the University of Aarhus in Denmark was used to record solid state CD spectra down to 120 nm.
At the quantum mechanical level, the feature density of circular dichroism and optical rotation are identical. Optical rotary dispersion and circular dichroism share the same quantum information content.

See also

Linear dichroism
Magnetic circular dichroism
Optical activity
Optical isomerism
Optical rotation
Optical rotatory dispersion
Protein circular dichroism data bank
Two-photon circular dichroism
Vibrational circular dichroism
Hyper Rayleigh Scattering Optical Activity

References

External links
 Circular Dichroism spectroscopy by Alliance Protein Laboratories, a commercial service provider
 An Introduction to Circular Dichroism Spectroscopy by Applied Photophysics, an equipment supplier
 An animated, step-by-step tutorial on Circular Dichroism and Optical Rotation by Prof Valev.

Polarization (waves)
Physical quantities
Protein structure